The Kizlyar Bay ( Kizlyarskiy Zaliv) is a bay of the Caspian Sea located in the Republic of Dagestan, Russian Federation.

If the plans for the proposed Eurasia Canal, linking the Caspian Sea with the Black Sea, are ever implemented, it will likely have the Kizlyar Bay as its eastern end.

Geography
Tyuleniy Island lies near the entrance to the bay.

The Kuma, Prorva and Talovka rivers discharge into the bay, reducing the salinity to 5 PPT.

Protected area
The Dagestan Nature Reserve is a protected areacovers the entire area of the gulf, including the island of Morskoy Biryuchok. The hinterland is a low and marshy area of wetlands. The large Sarykum dune, located in another area further to the south, is part of the reserve.

References

External links
Overview of oil and natural gas in the Caspian Sea region Last Updated: August 26, 2013

Bodies of water of Dagestan
Bays of Russia
Bays of the Caspian Sea